Census-designated places (CDPs) are unincorporated communities lacking elected municipal officers and boundaries with legal status. North Dakota has 44 census designated places.

Census-designated place
Population data based on 2010 census.

References

Census-designated places in North Dakota
North Dakota